"This Years Love" may refer to:

 This Year's Love, a 1999 film directed by David Kane
 "This Year's Love" (song), a song by David Gray from his album White Ladder